Bridlewood is a suburban residential neighbourhood in the southwest quadrant of Calgary, Alberta. It is located at the southwestern edge of the city, north of Stoney Trail and south of the community of Evergreen. To the east it borders the Bridlewood Creek Wetland, a wetland created by the City of Calgary as a stormwater retention pond. The Spruce Meadows equestrian facility is located immediately south.

It is represented in the Calgary City Council by the Ward 13 councillor.

Demographics

Residents in this community had a median household income of $70,477 in 2000, and there were 6.2% low income residents living in the neighbourhood. As of 2000, 15.9% of the residents were immigrants. All buildings were single-family detached homes, and 4.3% of the housing was used for renting.

Education
Bridlewood has 1 catholic (Monsignor J.J O'Brien), (Grades K-9), 1 Christian (Glenmore Christian Academy), (Grades K-9) and 1 public school (Bridlewood Elementary), (Grades K-6).

See also
List of neighbourhoods in Calgary

References

External links
Somerset - Bridlewood Community Association

Neighbourhoods in Calgary